Optomechanics is the manufacture and maintenance of optical parts and devices. This includes the design and manufacture of hardware used to hold and align elements in optical systems, such as:
 Optical tables, breadboards, and rails
 Mirror mounts 
 Optical mounts 
 Translation stages
 Rotary stage
 Optical fiber aligners
 Pedestals and posts
 Micrometers, screws and screw sets

Optomechanics also covers the methods used to design and package compact and rugged optical trains, and the manufacture and maintenance of fiber optic materials

References

 
Optical devices